Artabuynk is a village in the Yeghegis Municipality of the Vayots Dzor Province of Armenia. The Smbataberd fortress is located near the village.

Etymology 
The village was previously known as Yeghegis, Yekhegis, Alagyaz and Erdapin.

Gallery

References

External links 

World Gazeteer: Armenia – World-Gazetteer.com

Populated places in Vayots Dzor Province